Anne Kathrin Schade  (born ) was a German female volleyball player. She was part of the Germany women's national volleyball team.

She participated in the 1994 FIVB Volleyball Women's World Championship. On club level she played with USC Munster.

Clubs
 USC Munster (1994)

References

External links

1968 births
Living people
German women's volleyball players
Place of birth missing (living people)